Cynodon plectostachyus, the giant star grass, is a species of grass (family Poaceae). It is native to Chad, Ethiopia, Uganda, Kenya, and Tanzania, and has been introduced as a livestock forage to California and Florida in the United States, Mexico, Honduras, Cuba, the Dominican Republic, Haiti, Paraguay, Argentina, Nepal, and Bangladesh. An aggressive competitor, it is now the most widespread grass in the New World Tropics. It is typically paired in a silvopastoral system with Leucaena leucocephala.

References

Chloridoideae
Forages
Flora of Chad
Flora of Ethiopia
Flora of East Tropical Africa
Plants described in 1907